Kate McMurray is an author of gay romance who has served as president of Rainbow Romance Writers, the LGBT romance chapter of Romance Writers of America. Her stories have been published in English, French, Italian, and Spanish. She was born on July 3, 1980 and lives with her two cats in Brooklyn, NY.

Kate was appointed to the Romance Writers of America (RWA) board of directors in May 2019

Bibliography

Novels 
 Across the East River Bridge (2012) Winner of the 2012 Rainbow Award as Best Gay Paranormal/Horror  
 Kindling Fire With Snow (2010)
 Across the East River Bridge (2012)
 Out in the Field (2012)
 There Has to Be a Reason (2017)
 Such a Dance (2015)
 The Boy Next Door (2016)
 In Hot Pursuit (2010)
 The Wind Up
 Save the Date 
 Four Corners (English Edition) (2012)
 Cuatro Esquinas  (Spanish Edition) (2014) 
 Les quatre coins (French Edition) (2014)
 Alle quattro basi (Italian Edition) (2015)
 The Silence of the Stars (2014)
 Ten Days in August (2016) 
 In Hot Pursuit (2018) 

 Dreamspun Desires Series
 The Greek Tycoon’s Green Card Groom (Dreamspun Desires 14) (2016) The Rainbow League Book Series
 The Windup (Book 1) (April 24, 2015)
 Thrown a Curve (Book 2) (June 19, 2015)
 The Long Slide Home (Book 3) (August 14, 2015)

 Short fiction 
 One Man to Remember (Playing Ball: Anthology) (2013) Winner of the 2014 Rainbow Award as best Anthology  
 Rebels at heart''* (For Love & Liberty: Untold love stories of the American Revolution: Anthology)

References 

Living people
20th-century American novelists
21st-century American novelists
American women novelists
Writers from New York City
American chick lit writers
20th-century American women writers
21st-century American women writers
1980 births
Novelists from New York (state)
American romantic fiction novelists
Women romantic fiction writers